"Train Your Child" was recorded in 1928 by Washington Phillips (18801954). It is remarkable in that it divides into two distinct parts: (1) a spoken homily by him about child-rearing, and (2) an instrumental solo in gospel blues style on his unique zither-like instrument.

The homily comments on the Book of Proverbs (attributed to King Solomon) at 22:6:

Recordings 
 1928Washington Phillips, 78rpm single Columbia 14448-D

References 

Blues songs
Gospel songs
Washington Phillips songs
1928 songs
Columbia Records singles